Michael Newton Barber  (born 30 April 1947) is a mathematician, physicist and academic. He was Vice Chancellor of Flinders University in South Australia from 2008 until 2014.

Career 
Barber studied at the University of New South Wales, where he received the University Medal in applied mathematics and graduated with first class honours. He received a PhD from Cornell University in the USA in theoretical physics in 1972.
He is best known for the scaling theory of finite size effects at phase transitions, which he introduced together with Michael Fisher.

Barber worked at the Australian National University and University of New South Wales as an academic in the 1970s and 1980s. in 1990, he was appointed Dean of the Faculty of Science at the ANU.

He assumed his first office-bearing position as Pro Vice Chancellor (Research) at the University of Western Australia in 1994 and held the position until 2002. That year, Barber was appointed Executive Director, Science Planning at the CSIRO. In 2006, he was appointed Group Executive, Information, Manufacturing and Minerals. He held this position until his appointment as Vice-Chancellor at Flinders University in 2008—a position he held until December 2014. During his time as Vice Chancellor he worked "to enhance the University’s contribution to the ‘new South Australia’ with its strong defence and resources sectors." In 2008 he stated: "The University is already more engaged with the defence and resource industries than many people recognise but we need to further strengthen the science and technology base at Flinders so that the University is better positioned to grasp more of the opportunities in the new South Australia. We need to work through this in a planned and deliberate way to find appropriate strategies to address it."

In 2012, Barber was a member of the South Australian State Advisory Council of the Committee for Economic Development of Australia (CEDA).

That same year, Barber's salary for his position as Vice Chancellor of Flinders University became a controversial topic. The Advertiser revealed that he would receive between $710,000 and $719,999 in 2012. In 2010 his salary had been $545,000. A spokesperson from Flinders University stated that his remuneration was "in line" with industry standards.

Throughout his career, Barber has acted as an advisor on science and research matters to government and industry in Australia and overseas.

Recognition
Barber was elected a Fellow of the Australian Academy of Science in 1992. He served as the organisation's Secretary, Science Policy from 2001 until 2005. In 2001 he was awarded the Centenary Medal "for service to Australian society through university administration and scientific research". In 2009 he was elected a Fellow of the Society for Industrial and Applied Mathematics (SIAM).

In 2018 Barber was appointed an Officer of the Order of Australia (AO) for "distinguished service to higher education administration, and in the field of mathematical physics, particularly statistical mechanics, as an academic and researcher, and through contributions to science policy reform".

Personal life
Barber's father was noted Australian botanist and geneticist Horace Barber .

References

External links 
Biographical entry, Encyclopedia of Australian Science
SIAM fellows: class of 2009

Living people
Australian mathematicians
University of New South Wales alumni
Cornell University alumni
Academic staff of the Australian National University
Academic staff of the University of New South Wales
Academic staff of the University of Western Australia
Vice Chancellors of Flinders University
Fellows of the Australian Academy of Science
Officers of the Order of Australia
1947 births